Three Girls is a three-part British television drama series, written by screenwriter Nicole Taylor, and directed by Philippa Lowthorpe, broadcast on three consecutive nights between 16 and 18 May 2017 on BBC One. A co-production between BBC Studios and Studio Lambert, the series is a dramatised version of the events surrounding the Rochdale child sex abuse ring, and describes how the authorities failed to investigate allegations of rape because the victims were perceived as unreliable witnesses.

Three Girls drew a strong viewing audience upon its first broadcast, with 8.24 million viewers for episode one, 7.88 million for episode two and 8.19 million for episode three. The series was released on DVD in Region 2 on 8 January 2018.

A BBC documentary on the case, The Betrayed Girls, was broadcast on 3 July 2017 as a follow-up to the drama.

Plot 
The story is told from the viewpoint of three of the victims: fourteen-year-old Holly Winshaw (Molly Windsor), sixteen-year-old Amber Bowen (Ria Zmitrowicz) and her younger sister Ruby (Liv Hill); although the focus later shifts to sexual health worker Sara Rowbotham (Maxine Peake), the main whistleblower who drew attention to the case after repeated pleas for help from social services and the police fell on deaf ears.

DC Margaret Oliver (Lesley Sharp), the lead investigator on the case, manages to gain the support of her superior officer, Sandy Guthrie (Jason Hughes) to instigate a full-blown investigation. However, despite significant evidence, the CPS decided to drop the case because of an “unrealistic prospect of conviction”. After Margaret convinces Amber Bowen to testify against her former boyfriend, Tariq (Wasim Zakir), the case is re-opened by recently appointed public prosecutor Nazir Afzal (Ace Bhatti), who with the assistance of the police and the victims involved, manages to secure convictions against ten men involved in the ring.

Rowbotham, Oliver, and Afzal all acted as consultants on the series.

Cast
 Maxine Peake as Sara Rowbotham
 Lesley Sharp as DC Margaret Oliver
 Molly Windsor as Holly Winshaw
 Ria Zmitrowicz as Amber Bowen
 Liv Hill as Ruby Bowen
 Ace Bhatti as Nazir Afzal
 Paul Kaye as Jim Winshaw
 Jill Halfpenny as Julie Winshaw
 Bo Bragason as Rachel Winshaw
 Lisa Riley as Lorna Bowen
 Naomi Radcliffe as Yvonne
 Jason Hughes as DC Sandy Guthrie
 Rupert Procter as DC Jack Harrop
 Ross Anderson as PC Richard Bryan
 Antonio Aakeel as Immy
 Wasim Zakir as Tariq
 Zee Sulleyman as Billy
 Simon Nagra as Daddy

Episodes

Link to Finsbury Park attack

In June 2017, a terrorist attack was launched against mosque-goers in Finsbury Park. The attacker, Darren Osborne, used a van to run over Muslim pedestrians, killing one man and injuring several others. In the course of the trial, it was remarked that Osborne developed an obsession with Muslims after watching Three Girls.

Reception

Accolades

See also
 Post-assault treatment of sexual assault victims

References

External links
 
 

2017 British television series debuts
2017 British television series endings
2010s British crime television series
2010s British drama television series
BBC high definition shows
BBC television docudramas
British crime drama television series
British Pakistani mass media
2010s British television miniseries
Child sexual abuse in England
Child abuse in television
English-language television shows
History of the Metropolitan Borough of Rochdale
Rape in television
Television series by All3Media
Television series set in the 2000s
Television shows set in Greater Manchester
Television shows scored by Natalie Holt